The Whalestoe Letters (2000), by the American fiction author Mark Z. Danielewski, is an epistolary novella which more fully develops the literary correspondence between Pelafina H. Lièvre and her son Johnny from 1982–1989, characters first introduced in Danielewski's prior work House of Leaves.

The letters are included in the second edition of House of Leaves, in Appendix II, under the name E – The Three Attic Whalestoe Institute Letters, although the companion piece includes eleven additional letters not found in House of Leaves.

Plot introduction

Pelafina writes these letters to Johnny from The Three Attic Whalestoe Institute, a mental institution where she has been residing for a number of years. While a number of these letters appear in House of Leaves, The Whalestoe Letters introduces a number of new letters which serve to more fully develop Pelafina's character as well as her relationship with Johnny.

External links
 Pantheon Books catalog page
 Powells Books review

2000 American novels
American novellas
Novels by Mark Z. Danielewski
Postmodern novels
Epistolary novels
Pantheon Books books